Bank Building, or variants thereof, may refer to:

United States
 Bank Building (Accomac, Virginia), listed on the National Register of Historic Places listings in Accomack County, Virginia
 Bank Building (Uxbridge, Massachusetts), a historic building located at 40–44 South Street, in Uxbridge, Massachusetts

United Kingdom
 Bank Buildings, Belfast, a building located at 1–27 Castle Street in Belfast, Northern Ireland
 Bank Buildings, Birkenhead, on a corner site at 1–7 Charing Cross, Birkenhead, Wirral, England

See also
 :Category:Bank buildings